The 19th Asian Athletics Championships were held in Kobe, Japan between July 7–10, 2011 at the Kobe Universiade Memorial Stadium. The tournament had 507 athletes from forty Asian nations competing in the 42 track and field events over the four-day competition.

Two countries dominated the events: the host nation Japan won the most medals at the competition (32 overall, 11 golds), closely followed by China's eleven golds and 27 overall medal haul. The next most successful countries were Bahrain (which won five golds on the track through its former Ethiopian and Kenyan runners) and India, which won twelve medals.

A total of eight Championship records were equalled or beaten at the competition. India's Mayookha Johny won the long jump and also broke the Indian record to take bronze in the triple jump. Twenty-year-old Mutaz Essa Barshim cleared 2.35 metres in the high jump. Liu Xiang won his fourth consecutive 110 metres hurdles title with a championship record mark. Kuwait's Mohammad Al-Azemi completed an 800/1500 metres double with Iranian Sajjad Moradi finishing as runner-up both times. On the women's side, Truong Thanh Hang of Vietnam won the 800 m and was the 1500 m silver medallist.

Gretta Taslakian of Lebanon and Iraqi Gulustan Ieso won their countries' first medals in the women's section, while the traditionally male-only United Arab Emirates sent their first female athlete to the competition (Betlhem Desalegn). Ieso and Olga Tereshkova both failed doping tests at the competition, thus losing their individual medals and also their team relay medals.

Medal summary

Men

Women

Note: The original gold and silver medallists, Kazakhstan's Olga Tereshkova and Iraq's Gulustan Ieso, were later disqualified after testing positive for testosterone and methylhexaneamine, respectively. Initial bronze medallist Chen Jingwen of China was elevated to the gold medal position, while fourth and fifth placed runners Chandrika Subashini and Chisato Tanaka moved into the minor medal positions. The Kazakhstan and Iraqi  relay quartets were also disqualified as a result. India were promoted to silver medallists and the bronze was vacated as only four teams participated.

Medal table

The medal changes due to doping disqualifications in the women's 400 m individual and relay events meant that China edged Japan to the top of the table. Kazakhstan fell from sixth to eighth place. Sri Lanka moved up from 19th to 15th place. Iraq received no medals.

Participating countries
464 athletes from 40 nations competed

References

Results
AsC  Kobe  JPN  7 - 10 July 19th Asian Championships. Tilastopaja. Retrieved on 2011-08-13.

External links
Results
Report of top eight finishers per event

 
Asian Athletics Championships
Asian Championships
2011 in Japanese sport
International athletics competitions hosted by Japan
2011 in Asian sport
Sports competitions in Kobe
July 2011 sports events in Japan